Only the Strong Survive is the twenty-first studio album by Bruce Springsteen, released on November 11, 2022, through Columbia Records. The album is a cover album of R&B and soul songs, and his second cover album following We Shall Overcome: The Seeger Sessions (2006). It was announced on September 29, 2022, along with the release of "Do I Love You (Indeed I Do)", a cover of the song by Frank Wilson. The singles "Nightshift", "Don't Play That Song" and "Turn Back the Hands of Time" followed throughout October and November 2022. The album title is an eponymous reference to its first track, a cover of the original Only the Strong Survive by Jerry Butler .

Background and recording
In mid-September 2022, Rolling Stone founder Jann Wenner revealed that Springsteen planned to release a new album before the end of the year. Springsteen formally announced the record on September 29, and expressed in a statement that he "wanted to make an album where [he] just sang" and tried to "do justice" to "the great American songbook of the '60s and '70s". He recorded the album at his Thrill Hill Recording studio in New Jersey following his sessions for Letter to You (2020). The album was produced by Ron Aniello, who played all the instruments except Springsteen's guitar and piano, and horns played by the E Street Horns. It also includes two duets with Sam Moore.

Promotion
Springsteen began promoting the album by posting teaser videos on social media in September 2022, including audio snippets of the covers. A music video was released for the album's first single, "Do I Love You (Indeed I Do)", on September 29. A music video for the album's second single, "Nightshift", was released on October 14. A music video for the album's third single, "Don't Play That Song", was released on October 28. The album's fourth single, "Turn Back the Hands of Time", also received a music video on November 11, 2022.

Springsteen promoted the album's release with four appearances on The Tonight Show Starring Jimmy Fallon from November 14 to 16, 2022, along with a special Thanksgiving episode on November 24, 2022.

Critical reception

On Metacritic, Only the Strong Survive received a score of 74 out of 100 based on seventeen critics' reviews, indicating "generally favorable" reception. Erica Campbell of NME felt that Springsteen "resurrects these classics as a means of celebration, pointing back to some of the strongest songwriters and vocalists of all time with 15 huge and heartfelt tributes, as opposed to just churning out shallow reimaginings". Jonathan Bernstein of Rolling Stone wrote that although it is a "shame" that aside from horn players and a "Sam Moore cameo, none of the soul-steeped musicians from Springsteen's past are to be found on his R&B love letter" and "even if the arrangements occasionally feel static in their mimicry, Springsteen's voice shines and sparkles".

Clashs Emma Harrison described Only the Strong Survive as "an astute sonic journey through a genre that has always resonated with The Boss", writing that it is "unequivocally clear" the "passion" Springsteen has for the genres of soul and R&B, as well as an "ideal opportunity for a new audience to discover glorious discoveries from a rock 'n' roll stalwart". Michael Elliott of PopMatters agreed that Springsteen's "love for this timeless, joyous soul music is jubilant and infectious", opining that while his lead vocal "mostly delivers" and his "robust rasp is perfect for" the album, there are moments where he "struggles, sounding rushed, as the song overpowers him".

Reviewing the album for musicOMH, John Murphy remarked that "the record works best when it dives into less familiar territory", calling the album "pretty much Bruce does karaoke, but when it's done this well and with so much obvious love for the source material, it's irresistible". Neil McCormick of The Telegraph found that the album "remind[s] us how much R'n'B filtered into the epic rock sound he ultimately developed" and compared it to "stumbling into the world's greatest bar band playing the world's greatest setlist at the wildest shindig ever thrown". Stephen Thomas Erlewine of AllMusic wrote that the tracks chosen for the album "demonstrate deep knowledge and good taste" and "enjoyable enough" that "Springsteen and Aniello aren't exactly re-interpreting these 15 songs: they're merely playing them for a lark".

Sam Sodomsky of Pitchfork wrote that the album has "character, and more than that, it's got energy: Springsteen has never sounded quite so lighthearted, so unburdened, on record", summarizing that Springsteen "seems more driven by the act of creating itself: lighting a spark" and knowing others could find the "hope" in the songs that they originally "provided for him".

Track listing

Personnel
Musicians

 Bruce Springsteen – vocals (all tracks); background vocals, keyboards (track 5); guitar (6, 10, 11), piano (7)
 Ron Aniello – bass, drums, guitar (all tracks); percussion (1–10, 14, 15), piano (1–6, 8–15), organ (1–4, 6–8, 10–15), vibraphone (1, 4, 6, 8, 9, 13, 14), keyboards (3, 5, 7, 8, 10–13, 15), glockenspiel (4, 7, 12), background vocals (5); chimes, timpani (14)
 Ed Manion – baritone saxophone
 Tom Timko – baritone saxophone
 Bill Holloman – tenor saxophone
 Clark Gayton – trombone
 Barry Danielian – trumpet
 Curt Ramm – trumpet
 Soozie Tyrell – backing vocals (1, 4, 6)
 Lisa Lowell – backing vocals (1, 4, 6)
 Sam Moore – background vocals (2, 12)
 Curtis King Jr. – background vocals (3, 7–10, 13–15)
 Dennis Collins – background vocals (3, 7–10, 13–15)
 Fonzi Thornton – background vocals (3, 7–10, 13–15)
 Michelle Moore – background vocals (4, 6)
 Rob Mathes – conductor (4–10, 12, 14, 15)
 Lisa Kim – concertmaster, violin (4–10, 12, 14, 15)
 Clarice Jensen – cello (4–10, 12, 14, 15)
 Patrick Jee – cello (4–10, 12, 14, 15)
 Sophie Shao – cello (4–10, 12, 14, 15)
 Danielle Farina – viola (4–10, 12, 14, 15)
 Devin Moore – viola (4–10, 12, 14, 15)
 Rebecca Young – viola (4–10, 12, 14, 15)
 Annaliesa Place – violin (4–10, 12, 14, 15)
 Dasol Jeong – violin (4–10, 12, 14, 15)
 Joanna Maurer – violin (4–10, 12, 14, 15)
 Kristi Helberg – violin (4–10, 12, 14, 15)
 Kuan Cheng Lu – violin (4–10, 12, 14, 15)
 Sein Ryu – violin (4–10, 12, 14, 15)
 Sharon Yamada – violin (4–10, 12, 14, 15)
 Su Hyun Park – violin (4–10, 12, 14, 15)
 Suzanne Ornstein – violin (4–10, 12, 14, 15)
 Rob Lebret – guitar (8)

Technical
 Bruce Springsteen – production
 Ron Aniello – production, mixing, engineering
 Rob Lebret – mixing, engineering
 Bob Ludwig – mastering
 Andres Bermudez – engineering (2, 12)
 Jon Landau – executive production

Charts

Weekly charts

Year-end charts

Certifications

References

2022 albums
Albums produced by Ron Aniello
Bruce Springsteen albums
Columbia Records albums
Covers albums
Soul albums by American artists